Christopher Draper was an English flying ace.

Christopher Draper may also refer to:

Christopher Draper (mayor), Lord Mayor of London
Chris Draper, sailor
Kris Draper, ice hockey player